Sir Roger Casement is a 1968 German television miniseries depicting the efforts of the historical figure Sir Roger Casement to seek German aid for Irish independence during the First World War and his attempts to form an Irish Brigade of Prisoners of War. It was aired in two 90 minute parts.

Cast
 Heinz Weiss ...  Sir Roger Casement
 Kurt Hübner ...  Devoy
 Hans W. Hamacher ...  Redmond
 Fritz Haneke ...  MacNeill
 Hans Schellbach ...  Connolly
 Hans Timmermann ...  McGarrity
 Almuth Ullerich ...  Mary
 Hans Putz ...  Doyle
 Thomas Braut ...  Christensen
 Hans Paetsch ...  Grey
 Richard Lauffen ...  Findley
 Friedrich Schütter ...  Thomson
 Dieter Groest ...  Von Papen
 Viktor Warsitz ...  Graf Oberndorff
 Otto Preuss ...  Isendahl

External links
 

1968 television films
1960s German television miniseries
1968 German television series debuts
1968 German television series endings
World War I television drama series
Television series based on actual events
1960s German-language films
German-language television shows
ZDF original programming
1968 films
Films directed by Hermann Kugelstadt